Vucub-Caquix (possibly meaning 'seven-Macaw') is the name of a bird demon defeated by the Hero Twins of a Kʼicheʼ-Mayan myth preserved in an 18th-century document, entitled ʼPopol Vuhʼ. The episode of the demon's defeat was already known in the Late Preclassic Period, before the year 200 AD. He was also the father of Zipacna, an underworld demon deity, and Cabrakan, the Earthquake God.

The Kʼicheʼ Tale
Vucub-Caquix is described as a powerful bird pretending to be the sun and moon of the twilight world in between the former creation and the present one. According to modern Kʼicheʼ, his name refers to the seven stars of the Big Dipper asterism. The false sun-moon bird was shot out of his tree with a blowgun by Hun-Ahpu, one of the Maya Hero Twins, but still managed to sever the hero's arm. Finally, however, the demon was deprived of his teeth, his eyes, his riches, and his power. Together, the Twins were to become the true sun and moon of the present creation. The episode is only loosely connected to the main tale of the Twins, and is varied by other Mesoamerican hero myths. It is also akin to certain scenes in Mayan art dating back to the 8th century and before.

The Twins Shooting Vucub-Caquix: Earlier Scenes

The 16th-century Popol Vuh episode has been used for interpreting certain early stone monuments as well as Classic-period pottery scenes. References to the episode are already present on the Late Preclassic stela 25 from Izapa, near the Pacific coast, where a man with a mutilated arm looks upward towards a bird perched on a pole, and on a facade of the Copan ballcourt, where a war-serpent head inserted between the legs of a large bird holds the severed arm of Hunahpu. The episode has also been connected to Izapa's stela 2, where two small figures assumed to be the Twin Heroes flank a large descending bird personifier (perhaps a royal ancestor).

As to the Classic Mayan scenes painted on pottery, they show Hun-Ahpu (or Hun-Ahau) aiming his blowgun at a steeply descending bird with the characteristics of the so-called 'Principal Bird Deity', an avian transformation of Itzamna. The solar affiliation of (Kinich Ahau) Itzamna is part of the argument for identifying the Popol Vuh and the Classic episode, since the upper god's solar aspect seems to reflect the claim to solar status voiced by Vucub-Caquix.

Problems with the Vucub-Caquix Identifications

Leaving apart the representations on stone mentioned above, the identification of the Classic Mayan bird-shooting scenes on pottery with the shooting of Vucub-Caquix causes problems. For one, the bird involved is usually the avian transformation of the creator god, Itzamna, and the concept of a generally venerated creator god seems to be at odds with the demonic nature of Vucub-Caquix. Secondly, the shooting of the Principal Bird Deity includes elements foreign to the Quichean tale. The bird is clearly not a macaw, and instead of being perched in a tree, it can even assume the (deceptive?) shape of a heron or cormorant-like bird seated on the waters. Thirdly, and more basically, there is no reason why the Twins, being bird-hunters, should not have been involved in more than one bird-shooting episode. As a matter of fact, at least one pottery scene has Hun-Ahpu shooting a vulture. Therefore, rather than referring to the Vucub-Caquix tale, the shooting of the Principal Bird Deity may well represent a now lost bird-shooting episode of Twin mythology. It seems clear that if a generalized Vucub-Caquix theory is to stand the test, important questions still need to be answered.

Notes

Literature
Karen Bassie-Sweet, Maya Sacred Geography and the Creator Deities. Norman: University of Oklahoma Press 2008. 
 
Julia Guernsey, Ritual and Power in Stone. The Performance of Rulership in Mesoamerican Izapa Style Art. Austin: University of Texas Press 2006.
Nicholas Hellmuth, Monsters and Men in Maya Art. 
Karl Taube, Aztec and Maya Myths.
Dennis Tedlock (tr.), Popol Vuh''. New York: Simon and Schuster 1996.

Characters from the Popol Vuh
Maya deities
Legendary birds